Only the Super-Rich Can Save Us! is a 2009 work of fiction by American political activist Ralph Nader, described by him as a practical utopia, in the style of Edward Bellamy's 1888 utopian novel Looking Backwards.

Nader wrote the book to inspire imaginative solutions to the problem of corrupt politicians and financial institutions.

Similarity to Atlas Shrugged 
Just as Atlas Shrugged portrayed self-interested successful capitalists working to create a "Utopia of Greed" that is free from government, Only the Super-Rich Can Save Us! portrays an altruistic group of super-rich individuals working to "re-make government" and where "the rebellious rich take on the reigning rich."

The novel's protagonist is inspired by Warren Buffett. On August 14, 2011, Warren Buffett wrote an influential op-ed entitled, "Stop Coddling the Super-rich", which argues that the super-rich should bear more responsibility and pay their "fair share" of taxes.

References

External links

Only the Super-Rich Can Save Us! at Seven Stories Press

2009 science fiction novels
Works by Ralph Nader
Utopian novels
Seven Stories Press books